BAY-29952 is a broad spectrum insecticide.  It is listed as an extremely hazardous substance according to the U.S. Emergency Planning and Community Right-to-Know Act.

References

Acetylcholinesterase inhibitors
Organophosphate insecticides
Ethyl esters
Thioethers